The Nigerian Integrated Water Resources Commission (NIWRC) is the agency established to regulate water resources in Nigeria.

History 
Since 2020, there have been several controversies against the passing of the National Water Resources Bill. Most of the rejection around the bill was based on its requirement for individuals to obtain license before they can access drill water which the populace believed should be free. Part of the bill states that:

Functions 
The functions of NIWRC includes but are not limited to the following:

 issue water use licenses
 put indiscriminate drilling of boreholes in check 
 avoid pollution of ground water sources 
 implement and enforce water law
 manage bodies of water

References 

Water management authorities in Nigeria